The world record progression 1000 m speed skating men as recognised by the International Skating Union:

References
 Historical World Records. International Skating Union.
 

World 01000 men